R. K. Vijaymurugan is a film art director, production designer and actor, working in the Tamil film industry. He has worked in the films Goli Soda, Aravaan, Velaiilla Pattadhari, Maari, Thangamagan, NGK, and 
Iravin Nizhal. He won the Vijay Award for Best Art Director in 2012, for Aravaan.

Vijaymurugan grew up near Vettavalam in TamilNadu. He started working in the film industry as an assistant art director for the 2002 film Charlie Chaplin.

Awards 
Vijay Award for Best Art director - Aravaan 2012

Ananda Vikatan Cinema Awards  -  Aravaan 2012

References 

Indian art directors
Indian production designers
Tamil actors